Kipp Hill is a mountain in Greene County, New York. It is located in the Catskill Mountains south of Prattsville. Vly Mountain is located southwest, and Maben Hill is located east-southeast of Kipp Hill.

References

Mountains of Greene County, New York
Mountains of New York (state)